Toni Damigella (born July 19, 1966) is an American luger. She competed in the women's singles event at the 1984 Winter Olympics.

References

External links
 

1966 births
Living people
American female lugers
Olympic lugers of the United States
Lugers at the 1984 Winter Olympics
Sportspeople from Quincy, Massachusetts
21st-century American women